Philosophical anarchism is an anarchist school of thought which focuses on intellectual criticism of authority, especially political power, and the legitimacy of governments. The American anarchist and socialist Benjamin Tucker coined the term philosophical anarchism to distinguish peaceful evolutionary anarchism from revolutionary variants. Although philosophical anarchism does not necessarily imply any action or desire for the elimination of authority, philosophical anarchists do not believe that they have an obligation or duty to obey any authority or conversely that the state or any individual has a right to command. Philosophical anarchism is a component especially of individualist anarchism.

The scholar Michael Freeden identifies four broad types of individualist anarchism. He says the first is the type associated with William Godwin that advocates self-government with a "progressive rationalism that included benevolence to others". The second type is egoism, which is most associated with Max Stirner. The third type is "found in Herbert Spencer's early predictions" and in that of some of his disciples such as Wordsworth Donisthorpe, who foresee in this sense "the redundancy of the state in the source of social evolution". The fourth type retains a moderated form of egoism and accounts for social cooperation through the advocacy of the market, having such followers as the American individualist anarchist Benjamin Tucker and the green anarchist Henry David Thoreau.

Overview

Types and variations 
As conceived by William Godwin, philosophical anarchism requires individuals to act in accordance with their own judgments and to allow every other individual the same liberty. Conceived as egoistically by Max Stirner, it implies that the unique one who truly owns himself recognizes no duties to others. Within the limit of his might, he does what is right for him.

Rather than taking up arms to bring down the state, philosophical anarchists "have worked for a gradual change to free the individual from what they thought were the oppressive laws and social constraints of the modern state and allow all individuals to become self-determining and value-creating." Those anarchists may oppose the immediate elimination of the state by violent means out of concern that what remains might be vulnerable to the establishment of a yet more harmful and oppressive state. That is especially true among those anarchists who consider violence and the state as synonymous or that it is counterproductive if public reaction to violence results in increased "law enforcement" efforts.

Political and philosophical anarchism 
Magda Egoumenides writes, "The anarchist criticisms and ideal of legitimacy explain the link between philosophical and political anarchism: they remind us that the enduring deficiency of the state is a position that is initially shared by both forms of anarchism, and the moral criteria of philosophical anarchism are intended to be inherent in the society that political anarchism seeks to create." According to Egoumenides, "A demonstration of the compatibility of political anarchist social visions with the perspective and ideals of legitimacy of critical philosophical anarchism establishes a continuity within the anarchist ideology."

Michael Huemer writes, "In the terminology of contemporary political philosophy, I have so far defended philosophical anarchism (the view that there are no political obligations), but I have yet to defend political anarchism (the view that government should be abolished)." He argues that "the terminology is misleading" since "both kinds of 'anarchism' are philosophical and political claims."

Criticism 
Philosophical anarchism has met the criticism of members of academia following the release of pro-anarchist books such as A. John Simmons' Moral Principles and Political Obligations (1979). In The Problem of Political Authority: An Examination of the Right to Coerce and the Duty to Obey (2013), Michael Huemer defends his interpretation of philosophical anarchism and claims that "political authority is a moral illusion".

The law professor William A. Edmundson authored an essay arguing against three major philosophical anarchist principles that he finds fallacious. Edmundson claims that the individual does not owe a normal state a duty of obedience, but he considers that not to imply that anarchism is the inevitable conclusion and the state is still morally legitimate.

References

External links 
 
 Philosophical anarchism in the Stanford Encyclopedia of Philosophy.

Anarchist schools of thought
Political ideologies
Individualist anarchism
Libertarianism by form
Libertarian socialism
Sovereignty